Gautam Bhan is an LGBTQ+ rights activist in India as well as a researcher, writer and faculty member at the Indian Institute for Human Settlements. As the faculty member of IIHS, he works and teaches politics of poverty, inequality and development in Indian cities with a focus on housing, social security, governance and urban and planning theory. He is also the spokesman for LGBTQ+ rights and one of the petitioners in the legal battle to decriminalize homosexuality in India. He is the coordinator of Program for Working Professionals in Urban Development and  co-anchors three major research projects on evictions, urban inclusion, slum up-gradation, and the relationships between poverty, inequality and urban violence.

Education 
A visiting undergraduate scholar at Harvard University, Dr. Gautam Bhan completed his graduation from Amherst College with Political Economy and Development Studies in 2002. He then did his masters on Urban Studies from University of Chicago and Doctor of Philosophy (PhD), City/Urban, Community and Regional Planning from University of California, Berkeley.

Career 
Gautam Bhan is a senior consultant at Indian Institute for Human Settlements, an educational institution that intends to amalgamate research, teaching and practice urban housing, along with generating insight from the south. He was a research fellow on a study with the Society of Applied Studies for two years. Bhan is also the co-founder of New Text, a "print and electronic publishing house committed to expanding equitable, open and affordable access to knowledge and books". He appeared on TED Talks India in December 2017, where he spoke about his "bold plan to house 100 million people". He works as a leading columnist with The Indian Express, and has published a number of articles including those on LGBTQ+ pride and poverty.

Honors and awards 
Fellow, Social Science Research Council 2009–10; Berkeley Fellow 2007–2012; Award for Distinguished Academic Achievement, College of Environmental Design, UC Berkeley 2012.

Publication 
 Bhan, G., Srinivas, S., and Watson, V. (2017, Forthcoming) Routledge companion to planning in the global south. London: Routledge.
 Deb, A., & Bhan, G. (2016, Forthcoming). Indispensable yet inaccessible: the paradoxes of adequate housing in urban India. In India social development report 2016. New Delhi: Oxford University Press.
 Bhan, G. (2016). In the public’s interest: evictions, citizenship and inequality in contemporary Delhi. New Delhi: Orient Blackswan.
 Revi, A., Jana, A., Malladi, T., Anand, G., Anand, S., Bazaz, A., . . . Shah, S. (2015). Urban India 2015: Evidence. Bangalore: Indian Institute for Human Settlements.
 Bhan, G., & Jana, A. (2015). Reading spatial inequality in urban India. Economic & Political Weekly, 50(22), 49–54.
 Bhan, G., Goswami, A., & Revi, A. (2014). The intent to reside: spatial illegality, inclusive planning and urban social security. In O. Mathur (Ed.), Inclusive urban planning: state of the urban poor report 2013 (pp. 83–94). New Delhi: Oxford University Press.
 Bhan, G. (2014). Continuity amidst change: learning from Rajiv awas yojana. Yojana, 58, 64 – 67.
 Bhan, G. (2014). Moving from giving back’ to engagement. Journal of Research Practice, 10(2), 1–4.
 Bhan, G. (2014). The impoverishment of poverty: reflections on urban citizenship and inequality in contemporary Delhi. Environment and Urbanization, 26(2), 547–560.
 Bhan, G. (2014). The real lives of urban fantasies. Environment & Urbanization, 26(1), 232–235.
 Bhan, G., Narain, A. (2005) Because I Have a Voice. Delhi: Yoda Press.



References

Living people
Amherst College alumni
Indian LGBT rights activists
UC Berkeley College of Environmental Design alumni
University of Chicago alumni
Year of birth missing (living people)
Scholars from Delhi